The Trial of the Chicago 7 is an historical legal drama written and directed by Aaron Sorkin. The film follows the Chicago Seven, a group of anti–Vietnam War protesters charged with conspiracy and crossing state lines with the intention of inciting riots at the 1968 Democratic National Convention in Chicago. The Group was originally the Chicago 8 with Bobby Seale being played by Yahya Abdul-Mateen II at the start of the trial. The rest of the Seven defendants were portrayed by Eddie Redmayne, Sacha Baron Cohen, Jeremy Strong, John Carroll Lynch, Alex Sharp, Noah Robbins, and Daniel Flaherty. The ensemble cast includes Joseph Gordon-Levitt, Mark Rylance, Frank Langella, and Michael Keaton,

The film received six Academy Award nominations, including  Best Picture, Best Supporting Actor for Sacha Baron Cohen, and Best Original Screenplay for Aaron Sorkin. The film also received 3 British Academy Film Awards nominations, 5 Golden Globes Awards nominations, and 3 Screen Actors Guild Award nominations.

Major associations

Academy Awards

British Academy Film Awards

Directors Guild of America Awards

Golden Globe Awards

Producers Guild of America Awards

Screen Actors Guild Awards

Writers Guild of America Awards

Critics awards

Chicago Film Critics Association

Critics' Choice Awards

Detroit Film Critics Society

Hollywood Critics Association

Houston Film Critics Society

London Film Critics' Circle

Online Film Critics Society

San Diego Film Critics Society

San Francisco Bay Area Film Critics Circle

Seattle Film Critics Society

St. Louis Film Critics Association

Vancouver Film Critics Circle

Washington D.C. Area Film Critics Association

Miscellaneous awards

References

External links
 

Trial of the Chicago 7, The